Pope Benedict XV created 32 cardinals in five consistories over less than seven and a half years, with a three year gap during the worst fighting of the First World War. Nineteen of the 32 were Italian, twelve came from other European countries, and the lone non-European was Dennis Dougherty from the United States. They included Achille Ratti, his successor as Pope Pius XI and one name, that of the German Adolf Bertram, reserved in pectore for three years.

6 December 1915

With Europe at war, Pope Benedict created six cardinals at a consistory on 6 December 1915. Two were Italian archbishops; the others, three Italians and an Austrian, had served in the diplomatic corps of the Holy See. Four of the six received their cardinals' galeros and their titular church assignments on 9 December, while Frühwirth and Leguigno remained at the nunciatures in Munich and Vienna. The membership of the College of Cardinals after this consistory included 29 Italians and 32 non-Italians.

4 December 1916

Benedict held a consistory to create cardinals on 4 December 1916. No cardinals from Germany or Austria-Hungary attended. The ten new cardinals were all natives of and working in France and Italy, part of the opposing wartime alliance. He also said he was appointing two more in pectore. All ten, joined by the papal diplomat Andreas Frühwirth, a native of Austria who was made a cardinal a year earlier, attended the public consistory on 7 December where they received their red galeros and were assigned their titular churches. One cardinal created but unnamed was Adolph Bertram, whose German homeland was fighting against Italy and its allies. The other Benedict never identified.

Cardinal in pectore

15 December 1919

Benedict created six cardinals on 15 December 1919, three Italians, two Poles, and one Spaniard. All attended the public consistory three days later to receive their cardinals' galeros and be assigned their titular church or deaconry, except for Juan Soldevilla y Romero, Archbishop of Zaragoza. Adolf Bertram, created a cardinal in pectore in 1916, participated in this consistory as well. At the close of this consistory, the College of Cardinals had 63 members, 32 Italians and 31 non-Italians.

7 March 1921

Benedict added six prelates to the College as cardinal priests on 7 March 1921, two Germans, 2 Spaniards, an American, and an Italian. Three of them–Faulhaber, Dougherty, and Schulte–received their red galeros and titular church assignments on 10 March. The six names had been announced on 22 February.

13 June 1921
Benedict named three Italian cardinals at his last consistory, including Achille Ratti, who succeeded him as Pope Pius XI in February 1922. Three others made cardinals the previous March participated, having been first awarded their red hats by the King of Spain: Francesco Ragonesi, Papal Nuncio to Spain, and the Spanish bishops Juan Benlloch i Vivó and Francisco Vidal y Barraquer. On 16 June, Benedict gave them all their red galeros and the five cardinal priests received their titular church assignments and the one cardinal deacon, Laurenti, his deaconry. Italian newspapers reported that Benedict privately told the three new cardinals that "We gave you the red robe of a Cardinal.... very soon, however, one of you will wear the white robe".

Notes

References

Additional sources

External links 

Benedict XV
College of Cardinals
20th-century Catholicism
 
Pope Benedict XV